Nattasha Bunprachom (born February 19, 1987,  in  Thailand), nickname Yoghurt, is a Thai model and actress.

Life 
Nattasha Bunprachom was born on February 19, 1987, as a Thai actress and model. Graduated from primary school level from Rudee School Secondary education from Suksanari School bachelor's and master's degrees from the Faculty of Engineering Chulalongkorn University (Electrical).

Career 
Nattasha Began to enter the fashion show. Besides that Yoghurt also entered the television drama. And was informed of the incident of a bad lady From the remake drama Nang Tard of TV Scene Causing Yoghurt to sign an act as an actor under Channel 3  

Nattasha has many plays. And a model Take a magazine Show the music video of the twisted music of Han The Star, the dream of Armchair, she's cocktail, the rest is true love of Pang-Nakarin, the 18th prize of 100 sexy girls FHM 2013

Personal life
She had relationship with Piyawat Kempetch (dj pk) Which is the MC and DJ   Both have been together for nearly 7 years   And the boyfriend asked for marriage. And she registered marriage and entered the United States on October 16, 2019.

Filmography

Television series

Music videos 
 Twisting the artist Han The Star
 Dreams? Artist Armchair
 Her artist Cocktail
 The rest is true love, artist Pang Nakarin
 On the side of the top artist Dance Nararak together with Jakchan Akamisiri Top
 Decadent artist Nararak dance

Award 
 18th Prize of 100 Sexy Girls FHM 2013
 HOWE AWARDS 2019 HOWE SOULMATE AWARD

References

External links 
 Social media 
 
 
 The article
 จัดล้วงใจ “โยเกิร์ต” นางแบบสุดฮอต หวานใจของนายพีเค – ผู้จัดการ
 เริ่มต้นชีวิตบนเส้นทางสายใหม่ในบทบาทนักแสดงของโยเกิร์ต – คมชัดลึก

1987 births
Living people
Nattasha Bunprachom
Nattasha Bunprachom
Nattasha Bunprachom
Nattasha Bunprachom
Nattasha Bunprachom
Nattasha Bunprachom